A list of films produced in Argentina in 1963:

External links and references
 Argentine films of 1963 at the Internet Movie Database

1963
Films
Argentine